The University of Texas at Dallas (UTD or UT Dallas) is a public research university in Richardson, Texas. It is one of the largest public universities in the Dallas area and the northernmost institution of the University of Texas system. It was initially founded in 1961 as a private research arm of Texas Instruments.

The young university has been characterized by rapid growth in research output and its competitive undergraduate admissions policies since its inception. Less than 47 years after its founding, the Carnegie Foundation had classified the university as a doctoral research university with "Highest Research Activity"—faster than any other school in Texas. The university is associated with four Nobel Prizes and has members of the National Academy of Sciences and National Academy of Engineering on its faculty with the most notable research projects including the areas of Space Science, Bioengineering, Cybersecurity, Nanotechnology, and Behavioral and Brain Sciences. UT Dallas offers more than 140 academic programs across its seven schools and hosts more than 50 research centers and institutes.

The college has a Division III athletics program in the American Southwest Conference and fields 14 intercollegiate teams, including a nationally recognized co-ed varsity Esports program. Additionally, the university recruits worldwide for its Top 4 collegiate chess team.

While the main campus is officially under the city jurisdiction of Richardson, one-third of it is within the borders of Dallas County. UTD also operates several locations in downtown Dallas - this includes the Crow Museum of Asian Art in the Arts District as well as multiple buildings in the Medical District next to UT Southwestern: the Center for BrainHealth, the Center for Vital Longevity, and the Callier Center for Communication Disorders.

History

Establishment 

Before they founded UT Dallas, Eugene McDermott, Cecil Howard Green and J. Erik Jonsson had purchased Geophysical Service Incorporated (GSI) on December 6, 1941 – the day before the attack on Pearl Harbor. With the rapid increase in defense contracts, the General Instrument Division of GSI grew substantially and was later reorganized under the name Texas Instruments, Inc. (TI) in 1951.

However, qualified personnel required by TI were not readily available in the Dallas–Fort Worth area. At the time, the region's universities did not provide enough graduates with advanced training in engineering and physical sciences. Texas Instruments was forced to recruit talent from other states during its expansion, and the founders observed in 1959 that "To grow industrially, the region must grow academically; it must provide the intellectual atmosphere, which will allow it to compete in the new industries dependent on highly trained and creative minds."

To compensate for a shortage, McDermott, Green, and Jonsson established the Graduate Research Center of the Southwest on February 14, 1961. While the institute initially was housed in the Fondren Science Library at Southern Methodist University, a nearby empty cotton field was later acquired by Jonsson, McDermott, and Green in Richardson, TX in 1962. The first facility, the Laboratory of Earth and Planetary Science (later named the Founders Building), opened in 1964. The Graduate Research Center of the Southwest was renamed the Southwest Center for Advanced Studies (SCAS) in 1967.

On June 13, 1969, Gov. Preston Smith signed House Bill 303, which added the institution to the University of Texas System as the University of Texas at Dallas (effective September 1, 1969). When Texas Instruments and UTD co-founders officially bequeathed the young university to the UT System, they boldly stated that they envisioned it would one day become the “MIT of the South.” At the time, the college only accepted graduate students for Masters and PhD programs – no undergraduate Bachelor degree programs were offered. Francis S. Johnson served as initial interim president before Bryce Jordan was selected in 1971.

Expansion and growth 

Founded at the dawn of the Information Age and steeped in science and technology, The University of Texas at Dallas has been more intent on creating the future than on preserving its history. As a result, not all relevant early historical details were documented carefully and fully; which is a reflection of the nature of a youthful institution's disregard for archiving. While some details were preserved, detailed historical documentation for the university did not start until around the late 2000s.

In July 1971, Bryce Jordan became the university's first president and served until 1981. At that time the campus consisted of only one facility (the Founders Building) and only admitted graduate students. During Jordan's 10-year tenure the university received  of land in 1972 from the Hoblitzelle Foundation. This allowed the campus to expand with the addition of a number of new facilities including most notable the Cecil H. Green Hall, the Eugene McDermott Library, and a campus bookstore. The school received accreditation from the Southern Association of Colleges and Schools in 1972, and the first diplomas were awarded in 1973.

The first bachelor's degrees were awarded in spring 1976. The Callier Center for Communication Disorders became part of the UTD in 1975 and the School of Management opened in 1975. Enrollment increased from 700 in 1974, to 3,333 in 1975, and later to more than 5,300 students in 1977.

UT Dallas's first Nobel laureate, the late Polykarp Kusch, was a member of the physics faculty from 1972 to 1982.

The first art installation, the Love Jack by Jim Love, was added to UTD's campus in 1976. The Visual Arts Building opened in 1978.

Robert H. Rutford, an Antarctic explorer recognized with the naming of the Rutford Ice Stream and Mount Rutford in Antarctica, became the second president of UT Dallas in May 1982. He served in this post until 1994. During his tenure as president, the university secured approval for a school of engineering, added freshmen and sophomores to its student body, and built the first on-campus housing.

The school became a four-year institution in fall 1990. The initial incoming freshman class was about 100 students. The state mandated that admission criteria for entering freshmen "to be no less stringent than the criteria of UT Austin".

Franklyn Jenifer became the third president of UT Dallas in 1994 and served until 2005. Under Jenifer, UT Dallas's enrollment increased over 61% - from less than 8,500 to nearly 14,000.

The chess club and debate program were founded in 1996, and later began offering academic scholarships for those skilled in either area. The Galerstein Women's Center also opened that year.

UT Dallas' ceremonial mace contains a university seal surrounding a wafer embedded with Texas Instruments microchips, representing TI's role in the founding of the college. A steel band in the headpiece and the metal foot of the staff fashioned from a scientific instrument designed by the UT Dallas Space Sciences Institute and were flown aboard the Space Shuttle Endeavor in September 1995.

In June 2005, David E. Daniel was appointed the university's fourth president. He previously served on the faculty at UT Austin and was the Dean of Engineering at the University of Illinois from 2001 to 2005. He has continued the expansion of the campus by adding the Natural Science and Engineering Research Laboratory, the Center for BrainHealth (near the University of Texas Southwestern Medical Center), and almost 600,000 square feet (56,000 m2) of new facilities added from 2007 to 2010.

The first campus mural was introduced in July 2008. The first fight song was written in September 2008; it was written to the music of Tiger Rag.

In November 2008, improvements included the addition of a tree-lined pathway to an entrance roundabout, and created a central mall area on campus that featured reflecting pools lined with magnolia trees, a chess plaza, the plinth, and misting column.

In 2010, the Student services building was added and UT Dallas had hit a record enrollment of over 17,000. In 2011, the new university Visitor Center & Bookstore opened.

Attempted DFW area UT System mergers 

In July 2001, the 77th Texas legislature failed to pass two proposed bills which had very different plans for the future of the Dallas–Fort Worth metroplex UT System intuitions.

The first plan, 77(R) HB 3568 proposed by Kenn George, would have consolidated the 2 universities and 1 medical school under the name "The University of Texas at Dallas". It would have established UT Dallas (UTD) in Richardson, TX as the main flagship campus, UT Southwestern Medical Center at Dallas (UTSW) as its medical school, and would have designated UT Arlington (UTA) as a UT Dallas satellite campus (a situation similar to UT Rio Grande Valley). The purpose of the bill was to consolidate all DFW UT System institutions into one, creating single cohesive flagship-level university for the Dallas–Fort Worth metroplex. However, the bill was unpopular with supporters of UT Arlington (because they wanted to retain their identity as a separate institution from UT Dallas) and the House Bill ultimately failed to pass. Despite this, UT Dallas has continued a close relationship with UT Southwestern. UT Dallas' Center for BrainHealth and Callier Center were built right next to UTSW's main campus in downtown Dallas. Additionally, UT Southwestern later established a Clinical Center in Richardson next to UTD's main campus.

The second plan, 77(R) HB 3607 proposed by Domingo Garcia, would have transferred UT Dallas, UT Southwestern, and UT Arlington to the University of North Texas System (to create something similar to the University of Houston System). The Denton, TX campus would have remained as the flagship university while the 3 Dallas–Fort Worth UT System institutions would have been designated as separate degree-granting sister UNT System colleges. Their names would have changed to the "University of North Texas at Dallas" located in Richardson, TX (not to be confused with the present-day UNTD campus established later in 2009), the "University of North Texas Southwestern Medical Center at Dallas" (UNTSW), and the "University of North Texas at Arlington" (UNTA). The law was left pending due to objections from both UT Arlington and UT Dallas, as both preferred to remain under the UT System.

Recent history 

On July 15, 2016 Dr. Richard C. Benson was appointed the fifth president of the University of Texas at Dallas. Previously he was Dean of the College of Engineering at Virginia Tech, which saw record growth from 2005 to 2016 after the number of engineering applicants nearly doubled during his tenure. He has continued the expansion of the UTD campus with the addition of The Bioengineering and Sciences Building, The Engineering & Computer Science West Building, a new Science Building, The Davidson-Gundy Alumni Center, and Northside Phase 1 & 2 (the first on-campus apartments with first floor retail space). Since 2016, UT Dallas' national US News ranking has jumped up from 140 to 129, tying it with University of Missouri, University of Kansas, University of Alabama, University of Nebraska – Lincoln, and Catholic University of America (most of which are current or former members of the Association of American Universities). Undergraduate applications have increased by 5%, undergraduate enrollment has increased by 16%, 6-year graduation rates increased by 4.5%, freshman retention rates have improved from 84% to 87%, and UTD was ranked #1 among universities under 50 years old.

In fall 2017, The University of Texas at Dallas adopted a secondary logo, the UTD Monogram. It is typically used to retain UT Dallas’ identity across digital platforms, as the primary logo does not adapt well to mobile devices or smaller screens. UT Dallas also adopted its first mascot logo for Temoc. Later in spring 2017, Davidson-Gundy Alumni Center opened.

In 2018, the University inherited the Barrett collection of Swiss art which will be housed in a new building as part of the Edith O'Donnell Institute of Art History. In January 2019, the family of Trammell and Margaret Crow donated the entire collection of the Crow Museum of Asian Art to The University of Texas at Dallas, along with $23 million in support funding to help build a structure on the university campus to show more of the artworks.

In fall 2019 UT Dallas marked its 50 years as a Texas public university (est. 1969), 44 years of undergraduate junior/senior enrollment (since 1975), 29 years of incoming freshmen enrollment (since 1990), and 58 years as a research center (founded in 1961).

Academics

Rankings 

In 2019, U.S. News & World Report in Best Colleges ranked UTD at 129th nationally and 61st among public universities. The 2017 Academic Ranking of World Universities placed UTD at 71st–99th in the United States. Washington Monthly's 2015 Annual College and University Rankings placed UTD at 99th in the United States. Kiplinger's Personal Finance magazine's 100 Best Values in Public Colleges 2016 ranked UTD at 33rd in value for in-state residents and 38th for out-of-state students.

Other rankings include:
 #17: Nature Index: Top 175 Young Universities of the World (2019) 
 Top Universities Under 50 Years Old (2018), Times Higher Education
 #31 Overall, #2 Texas, #1 Texas (Public) – Forbes (2019)
 #33 Overall, #2 Texas – Kiplinger (2016)
 #37 Overall, #2 Texas – Money Magazine (2016)
 UTD has placed on the Princeton Review Best Value list every year since 2012.
In 2017, UTD's MBA program ranked #1 based on salary-to-debt ratio in the United States according to US News (12:1 ROI).
 #1 Texas, #1 Southwest USA – Campus Pride Index (2019)
 UTD is the only university that has received the highest rating in Texas and in the southwest region (5 out of 5 stars).
 #1 Texas, #27 Overall – College Choice (2019)
 #1 Texas, #5 Overall – Affordable Colleges (2019)

Specific school and program rankings 
U.S. News & World Reports 2021 rankings of graduate school programs ranked the UTD's Engineering School at 62nd in the nation (4th in Texas), Electrical Engineering at 50th, Computer Engineering at 52nd, and Computer Science at 64th. The undergraduate Engineering program is ranked 75th nationally and 4th in Texas, after UT Austin, Texas A&M, and Rice.

Beginning in 2016, the Business School's graduate programs has been ranked 33rd nationally, tying with Rice University and University of Wisconsin-Madison (tied for #2 in Texas; ranking above Texas A&M and Southern Methodist University), while the part-time MBA program was ranked 29th nationally by US News. Additionally, the Online MBA's Graduate Business program was ranked 2nd nationally (1st in Texas), and the MBA specialty of information systems was ranked 16th nationally (2nd in Texas). Bloomberg Business Week Best Business Schools 2018 rankings places UTD 37th nationally and 3rd in Texas. The 2017 ARWU rankings placed UTD's studies in Economics/Business at 41st internationally.

In 2018, The Master of Science in Marketing program was ranked #5 nationally by College Choice.

In 2021, UTD's program in Audiology was ranked at 2nd nationally (1st in Texas) by US News while UTD's program in Speech-Pathology was ranked at 10th nationally (2nd in Texas).

UTD's graduate program in Game Design was ranked 21st in the Princeton Review 2019 list. Beginning in 2011, the undergraduate program was ranked in the Top 10.

In 2018, the UTD's program in Geography and Geospatial Sciences programs were ranked 1st in the nation for GIScience/Computation and Spatial Analysis/Statistics by Geographical Perspectives. The National Geospatial-Intelligence Agency and the U.S. Geological Survey designated the program a Center of Academic Excellence, the only one in Texas and one of 17 nationwide. In, 2010 they were ranked 16th nationally (1st in Texas) by Academic Analytics of Stony Brook, N.Y.

In 2017, the Social Sciences programs were ranked 51st-75th internationally by the ARWU.

In a 2012 study, assessing the academic impact of publications, the UTD's program in Criminology was ranked 5th in the whole world. The findings were published in the Journal of Criminal Justice Education. UT Dallas is also home to the #2 Most-Cited Criminologist, Dr. Alex Piquero and one of the Top Women in Criminology, Dr. Nicole Leeper Piquero.

The UTD Top 100 Business School Research Rankings 
The Naveen Jindal School of Management (Jindal or JSOM) annually releases its own ranking list for business schools based on research quantity and frequency. The list named "The UTD Top 100 Business School Research Rankings" uses a database that tracks the number of faculty publications in the 24 leading business journals, credits them to each business school, and ranks them in order by most publications in the past 5 years.

Colleges and schools 

For Fall 2021, The University of Texas at Dallas offered 146 academic programs across its seven schools including 56 baccalaureate programs, 59 master's programs and 31 doctoral programs. The school also offers 33 undergraduate and graduate certificates. The school offers a number of interdisciplinary degree programs.

In July 2022, UTDallas announced it would combine the School of Arts & Humanities with the School of Art, Technology and Emerging Communications (ATEC) to form the School of Arts, Humanities, and Technology (AHT) effective August 22, 2022.

The seven schools of UT Dallas for Fall 2022:

 School of Arts, Humanities and Technology 
 School of Behavioral and Brain Sciences
 School of Economic, Political and Policy Sciences
 Erik Jonsson School of Engineering and Computer Science
 School of Interdisciplinary Studies
 Naveen Jindal School of Management
 School of Natural Sciences and MathematicsThe Hobson Wildenthal Honors College offers several programs and support resources for high achieving students:
 The Eugene McDermott Scholars Program
 The Collegium V Honors Program
 The Davidson Management Honors Program
 National Merit Scholars Program
 Terry Scholars Program
 Office of Distinguished Scholarships
 Archer Program
 Phi Kappa Phi
 Texas Legislative Internship Program
 Model United Nations

Historically important degree programs 

In 2002 the UTD's Erik Jonsson School of Engineering and Computer Science was the first in the United States to offer an ABET-accredited B.S. degree in telecommunications engineering.
 In January 2007 UTD's School of Economic, Political and Policy Sciences began offering the first doctoral degree in criminology in Texas.
 In 2008 a complementary major, Emerging Media and Communication (EMAC), was offered.
 In 2015, the School of Arts, Technology, and Emerging Communications was founded offering programs in animation, design and creative production, game design, and critical media studies.
 The Geospatial Information Sciences program was the first from Texas admitted to the University Consortium for Geographic Information Science.
 UT Dallas is the fourth university in the nation to receive an accreditation from the United States Geospatial Intelligence Foundation (USGIF) for a Geospatial Intelligence certificate.
 The GIS program is ranked No. 1 in the nation for GIScience/Computation and Spatial Analysis/Statistics by Geographical Perspectives.

Student body 
In 2019 overall ethnicity population proportions, including undergraduate and graduate students, was Asian American 28%, White American 28%, International 19%, Hispanic 14%, African American 5%, Two or more races 3%. Fall 2017 first-time undergraduate acceptance rate was 69%, with some of the most selective graduate programs only accepting 4% of applicants. The top majors among undergraduates are biology, computer science, arts and technology, accounting, business administration, mechanical engineering, finance, neuroscience, psychology, and electrical engineering.

In the fall 2022–23 academic year, UTD enrolled 227 National Merit Scholars in its freshmen class of 4,220, which was the highest total number in Texas and one of the highest in the nation. The fall 2017 entering freshmen class had an average SAT composite score of 1323 and an average ACT composite score of 29. These freshman SAT/ACT scores are the highest averages in UTD's history – which surpassed Texas A&M's and matched UT Austin's averages of that year. For spring 2022 commencement, the university granted 4,881 bachelor's degrees, 2,333 master's degrees and 262 doctoral degrees for a total of 7,476 degrees.

Scholarship programs 
All freshmen admitted to the university are automatically considered for an Academic Excellence Scholarship (AES) Award. For the fall 2017 incoming freshmen class, the awards range from $3,000 per year for tuition and mandatory fees up to complete coverage of UT Dallas tuition and mandatory fees plus $3,000 per semester cash stipend to defray the costs of books, supplies and other expenses.

The McDermott Scholars Program, established at UT Dallas in 2000, provides full scholarships and unique cultural and civic opportunities to academically talented high school students.

The National Merit Scholars Program, established at UT Dallas in 2011, provides professional and cultural development, full tuition and mandatory fees and a generous additional stipend.

In 2006, UT Dallas became one of 13 universities in Texas affiliated with the Terry Foundation Scholarship. The Terry Scholars Program is a cohort experience that offers academic, cultural, service, mentoring, and other unique opportunities to traditional and transfer students awarded the prestigious scholarship.

Research 
UT Dallas is classified among "R1: Doctoral Universities – Very high research activity" and had research expenditures of $140 million for the 2022 fiscal year, $60 million of which came from federal fundings. Research projects include the areas of space science, bioengineering, cybersecurity, nanotechnology, and behavioral and brain sciences. The university has more than 50 research centers and institutes and the UTD Office of Technology Commercialization, a technology transfer center.

The William B. Hanson Center for Space Studies (CSS), affiliated with the Department of Physics, conducts research in space plasma physics. It has its roots in the Earth and Planetary Sciences Laboratory of the university's predecessor. The center conducts a NASA-sponsored mission, Coupled Ion-Neutral Dynamics Investigation (CINDI), which was launched in April 2008 in cooperation with the United States Air Force. CINDI, which is part of the payload for the Communication and Navigation Outage Forecast System program, seeks to uncover information about the equatorial plasma bubbles that interrupt radio signals. Under the leadership of John H. Hoffman, the center designed the mass spectrometer for the Phoenix Mars Lander as part of the Thermal and Evolved Gas Analyzer (TEGA) experiment in cooperation with the University of Arizona.

UT Dallas conducts cybersecurity research in a number of areas including cross-domain information sharing, data security and privacy, data mining for malware detection, geospatial information security, secure social networks, and secure cloud computing. The university is designated a National Center of Academic Excellence in Information Assurance Research for the academic years 2008–2013 by the National Security Agency and Department of Homeland Security.

The Alan G. MacDiarmid NanoTech Institute was established in 2001 when Bay Baughman, a pioneering nanotechnologist, became the Robert A. Welch Distinguished Chair in Chemistry and director of the university's NanoTech Institute. In 2007, it was renamed in memory of the late Alan G. MacDiarmid, who shared the 2000 Nobel Prize in chemistry with Alan Heeger and Hideki Shirakawa. The NanoTech Institute has produced more than 200 refereed journal articles, 13 of which have been published in Science or Nature, and given over 300 lectures in the United States and abroad. Ray Baughman was ranked number 30 on the March 2, 2011, Thomson Reuters list of the top 100 materials scientists. 

The Natural Science and Engineering Research Laboratory (NSERL), a four-story,  research facility, was completed in December 2006 after two years of construction. Including ISO 7 cleanroom facilities, the $85 million building provides open floor plans that allows chemists, biologists, nanotechnologists, materials scientists and other specialists to conduct multidisciplinary research. The laboratory provides extensive wet lab, fabrication, instrumentation, and high performance computing facilities to foster biomedical engineering and nano-technology research. The Nanoelectronics Materials Laboratory, on the fourth floor, includes a system that allows researchers to deposit thin film materials one atomic layer at a time. In May 2011 a $3 million JEOL ARM200F scanning transmission electron microscope with an atomic resolution of 0.78 picometers, was added to the research laboratory, already home to two transmission electron microscopes.

The Center for BrainHealth, both its own facility and part of the School of Behavioral and Brain Sciences, is a research institute with clinical interventions focused on brain health. The center is located near the UT Dallas' Callier Center for Communication Disorders and adjacent to the north campus of University of Texas Southwestern Medical Center in the city of Dallas. Brain research is concentrated on brain conditions, diseases, and disorders including, Attention Deficit Hyperactivity Disorder, autism, dementia, stroke, traumatic brain injury, and working memory.

The Callier Center for Communication Disorders became part of the University of Texas at Dallas in 1975 as part of the School of Human Development (now the School of Behavioral and Brain Sciences). Research, at the center, includes the causes, prevention, assessment and treatment of communication disorders and the facilities include laboratories for research in child language development and disorders, autism spectrum disorders, speech production, hearing disorders, neurogenic speech and language, cochlear implants and aural habilitation.

Additional ongoing research initiatives at UT Dallas include researchers overseeing the long-running British Election Study (BES). Harold Clarke, the Ashbel Smith professor of political science in the School of Economic, Political and Policy Sciences, and Marianne Stewart, professor of political science are the co-principal investigators for the study, which began in 1964 and is one of the world's oldest continuous political research projects. The other two co-investigators are David Sanders and Paul Whiteley of the University of Essex in England.

Campus

Main campus 

The Princeton Review's Guide to 332 Green Colleges: 2014 Edition recognized UTD for their green campus efforts.

While the main campus' address is officially within the jurisdiction of Richardson and Collin county, approximately one-third of the college today (one-half in 1969) is physically located within the border of Dallas county (which the city of Dallas typically governs). This section contains major areas in the south end of campus, including the Visitor Center, Bookstore, the Naveen Jindal School of Management, Athletics District and facilities, half of the Founders Building, parking lots, and some on-campus student housing (Canyon Creek and University Village buildings 1, 2, and 3). When UT Dallas started growing in the 1960s, the university needed to coordinate with one of the cities for water, electricity, sewer, police, and fire services. Dallas agreed to let Richardson officially host the university because it did not have the ability or capacity to support UTD at the time (a situation similar to SMU and University Park). Today, UT Dallas and Richardson share a close relationship and have strongly supported each other's growth for the past 50 years.

Other locations 
 Waterview Science & Technology Center and the Research and Operations Center, a leased building, is adjacent to the main campus and officially within Dallas city limits.
 Callier Center, consisting of 8 buildings, and the Center for BrainHealth, a single building, is adjacent to the University of Texas Southwestern Medical Center in the city of Dallas.
 Artist residency CentralTrak was located east of downtown Dallas one block away from Fair Park. It closed in 2017 due to a lease cancellation.
The Crow Museum of Art, acquired by UT Dallas in January 2019, is located in the Arts District in Dallas.
The Venture Development Center and Center for Emergent Novel Technology at the Innovation Quarter (CENT-IQ) will be located at the headquarters of the Innovation Quarter as part of a partnership between the City of Richardson and the University of Texas at Dallas to encourage innovation and entrepreneurship. A ribbon cutting ceremony on September 19, 2022 to officially launch CENT-IQ that will be home to five multi-disciplinary research centers.

Architecture 

The first campus development plan (1971) called for brutalist-style concrete architecture, a monorail, and skywalks. While not everything was implemented, some of the original elements outlined do remain today. The overall modern look and feel of the campus was inspired by the founders' vision of a "college of the future" – intentionally straying far from the traditional "red-brick" styles of older universities.

Early architecture on the campus (late 20th century) exhibits typical characteristics of Brutalism, a popular civic style when the structures were designed and built. In accordance with this style, many of the early buildings are pale, off-white, precast concrete with repetitive structures. Most of these buildings are concentrated towards the north end of the Mall area, the most notable being the Founders Building, Eugene McDermott Library, and Administration Building.

Later architecture (early 21st century) exhibits late modern or postmodern features such as bronze glass, bronze aluminum frames, unadorned geometric shapes, unusual surfaces, and unorthodox layouts. This styling is seen in the Engineering and Computer Science West building, School of Management, Cecil and Ida Green Center, and Natural Science and Engineering Research Lab facility (called the Mermaid Building due to its colorful anodized shingles). To provide protection from inclement weather and extreme temperatures, many of the buildings on campus are connected by a series of elevated indoor walking paths also referred to as skybridges.

The Student Services building, completed in 2010, is the first academic structure in Texas to be rated a LEED Platinum facility by the United States Green Building Council.

Landscape 

A $30 million Campus Landscape Enhancement Project, largely funded by Margaret McDermott (wife of UTD founder Eugene McDermott), was started in October 2008 and completed in late 2010. The project encompassed all aspects of landscape architecture from campus identity to pedestrian strategies, future growth patterns, sustainability and establishing a campus core. The first enhancement included the reforestation of the main entry drive with more than 5,000 native trees. Each tree was hand-picked and individually arranged by the landscape architect after study of native stands in Texas.

The next major enhancement a included the commitment to a riparian corridor, consisting of a densely planted natural creek bed along the central entry median to the campus Allée. The main Mall (or 'Allée') includes 116 hand-picked columnar 'Claudia Wannamaker' Magnolias alongside five reflecting pools and four human-scale chess boards (to represent the achievements of the school's chess team). At the northern terminus of the Mall (between the McDermott Library and the Student Union) is a pavilion-sized plaza, referred to by many students as "The Plinth". The plaza includes a granite fountain complete with mist column, an overhead trellis covered in wisteria vines, and a temperature-modifying shade structure design.

Phase II of the Campus landscape upgrades began in 2013, which included to the main pedestrian walkways and corridors on campus, the outdoor space between the Founders and University Theatre buildings, and other areas on campus. As a result of the Campus Enhancement Plan, the University was earned recognition by Tree Campus USA in the summer of 2017. About 6,800 trees can be found on the main campus representing 65 species. In order to maintain this designation, the University created the Tree Advisory Committee, a subcommittee of the Campus Sustainability Committee, and gave each tree a metal tag and GPS locator to manage tree health.

The most recent Phase III of the Campus Landscape Enhancement Project was completed in time for the Fall 2021 semester. This phase included converting a section of Rutherford Ave from North Loop Road to Franklyn Jenifer Drive into a 24-foot wide pedestrian-only promenade. Six brick signs matching that of the main entrance was also installed at major intersections and campus entrances. A bridge was also installed over Cottonwood Creek between Callier Center Richardson and the Bioengineering and Sciences Building which was finished in September 2021. A total of 1,200 trees were planted and enhancements were made to the Rock Garden behind the Founder Building.

Construction and development

Current projects 
 A new Science Building opened in fall 2020. The  space features laboratories, classrooms, and offices.
 Campus enhancement – Phase III, planned to create more outdoor gathering areas and green areas. It is scheduled to be finished in 2021.
 On-campus DART train stop on the Silver Line commuter rail in Northside area. Construction is planned to start in 2019 for completion in 2023. It is a part of the North Campus Transit Oriented Development Plan.
 A new parking structure will be completed in 2022 and house approximately 1,200 cars. It will be the 4th general on-campus parking garage.
 The arts and performance complex is planned to house the Edith O'Donnell Institute of Art History, significant art library collections—including the Barrett Swiss art collection and the Crow Family's Asian art collection.—and current and future gifts to the university. 
 Student Union Building renovation and expansion (or a completely new building to replace the current one) will begin in 2022 and be completed in 2025.
 UTD's latest Master Plan (2019) announced the development of a new Athletics District to the south of campus.
 The Master Plan outlines general plans to demolish some older buildings and surface parking lots. There are plans to build new parking garages, academic buildings (classrooms and research labs), student life development (housing/activities/dining), an academic quad, service buildings, a multi-purpose arena, an events center, and a recreation field.

Completed projects 
The first building on campus was the Laboratory of Earth & Planetary Science (completed in 1964), later renamed to the Founders Building. Notable campus buildings added in the 20th century include the Eugene McDermott Library (1975), Student Union (1981), Administration Building (1988), Waterview Apartments (1989), and the Activity Center (1998).

Campus development in early 21st century included the additions of the School of Management (2003) and the Natural Science & Engineering Research Lab "Mermaid Building" (2007). Starting in 2009, UT Dallas began experiencing major growth due to a rapidly increasing undergraduate population, new research opportunities, and donations. This spurred a series of campus developments that continues to present day. As a result, most of the signature landmarks on main campus are (at most) just a decade old. Below is a timeline of the largest recent additions to UTD's main campus in Richardson, TX.

2009

 The first dorm-style units & 2nd on-campus student housing development, Residence Hall South.
 Dining Hall (now the Student Union Food Court).
 University Parkway and Entrance, featuring a long road lined with 6,000+ native trees & shrubs along with a large roundabout intersection. It is the main entrance to UT Dallas, leading traffic and pedestrians to the south end of campus.

2010

 Enhancements to the central and south Mall area, a transformation that marked the first major efforts of beautifying the main campus. It was largely funded by donations from Margaret McDermott, the wife of one of UT Dallas' founders, Eugene McDermott. The construction added the four reflecting pools and surrounding magnolia trees in the south mall area. It also added the trellis and plinth to the center of the mall, which features a shady outdoor sitting area and a mist fountain.
 Student Services Building added 74,343 sq.ft. of student support offices/programs. This includes financial aid, the bursar's office, registrar and enrollment center, health and counseling services, career center, resident and housing operations, international student services, women's center, gender center (LGBTQ+), and more. The facade makes the building appear to float when viewed from various vantage points.
 Science Learning Center (SLC), featuring 76,000 sq.ft. of space for lecture halls, recitation rooms, and instructional labs. The exterior of the building is inspired by two patterns: atomic emission spectra of gases, and human DNA when it is separated in a process called gel electrophoresis.
 Renovation and expansion of the Founders Building, which added an atrium lobby, computer labs, classrooms, and offices.

2011

 The Visitor Center & University Bookstore, which also houses the tech store, copy center, and is attached to the rec center. It replaced the original campus bookstore that was constructed in 1978.
 The third on-campus student housing development, Residence Hall North.

2012

 The fourth on-campus student housing development, Residence Hall Northwest.
 Soccer Fields, for UTD's varsity DIII soccer teams.

2013

 The Edith O’Donnell Arts & Technology Building is home to the School of Arts, Technology, and Emerging Communication. The 155,000-square-foot building was designed by STUDIOS Architecture – the same firm that designed Google’s headquarters in Mountain View, Calif.  The footprint of the building is designed around cluster concepts allowing thinkers to gather and work. ATEC classrooms, research labs, and makerspace studios support new ways of collaboration for a community immersed in innovative practices.
 The 5th on-campus student housing development, Residence Hall Southwest.
 The first general on-campus parking garage, Parking Structure 1.
 Tennis Courts, for UTD's DIII varsity tennis teams.

2014

 A  expansion to the Naveen Jindal School of Management building.
 The sixth on-campus student housing development, Residence Hall West. It includes a dining hall, recreation center, and a resident parking garage.
 Parking Structure 2, the second general on-campus parking garage. It also houses retail space.

2015

 Beautification enhancement for the north Mall area.

2016

 The seventh on-campus student housing development, Northside Phase 1. It is the first urban mixed-use development apartment complex at UTD that includes first floor retail space, designed to serve both students and future DART light rail commuters.
 The Bioengineering and Sciences Building. The $108 million,  facility accommodates students in the science, technology, engineering and mathematics fields and provide research space for 70 faculty members.
 Parking Structure 4, the 3rd general on-campus parking garage.

2017

 The Davidson-Gundy Alumni Center, the first campus facility solely designated for special use. It features conference venues, meeting rooms, and event spaces and houses the Office of Development and Alumni Relations.
 The 8th and 9th on-campus student housing developments, Canyon Creek Heights North and South.
 A 68,700 sq.ft. addition to the Student Services Building.

2018

 The Engineering & Computer Science West Building. The 200,000-square-foot facility was built on the site of the (now-demolished) Clark Center.
 The 10th on-campus student housing development, Northside Phase 2.

2020

 The Sciences Building. The facility houses the Department of Physics and Mathematical Sciences and UTeach.
 Northside Phase 3. "Smart" student apartments added 370 beds and 246 living units.

2021

 Northside Phase 4. Additional 387 units and 675 beds added.

Under Construction
 Biomedical Engineering and Sciences Building. Future home of Fabrication and Biodesign Center. Located off the Main Campus, in Dallas near UT Southwestern Medical Center.
 DART Silver Line- UT Dallas Station. The Silver Line will run 26 miles from Plano to DFW Airport Terminal B and will connect to three of DART's light rail lines: Orange, Red and Green and to Trinity Metro TEXRail to downtown Fort Worth.
Phase one of the 12-acre, $158M cultural district, the Edith and Peter O’Donnell Jr. Athenaeum. is being built on the southeastern edge of the UTD campus. The Athenaeum will host a two-story, 68,000-square-foot second location for the Crow Museum of Asian Art. The other elements of the cultural district will feature 2 additional buildings: a two-story, 53,000-square-foot performance hall; and a two-story, 50,000-square-foot museum focused on traditional arts of the Americas, all surrounding a central plaza.

Art Museum 
In November 2018, the University announced the donation of the Barrett Collection of Swiss Art, the largest collection of swiss art outside of Switzerland. Shortly after, in January 2019, the family of Trammell and Margaret Crow, local real estate Mongol, donated the entire collection of the Crow Museum of Asian Art to The University of Texas at Dallas, along with $23 million in support funding to help build a structure on the university campus to show more of the artworks. This donation was a decade in the making by the Director of the Center for Asian Studies and Dean of the then School of Arts and Humanities, Dr. Dennis M. Kratz.

With the need to build an art museum to hold these vast collections, Dr. Richard Brettell, founding director of the Edith O'Donnell Institute of Art History and major orchestrator of the two acquisitions, was heavily involved in the design process, which was designed by the Los Angeles-based architecture firm Morphosis, which is also designed the renowned Perot Museum of Nature and Science in Downtown Dallas 

Located south of the Naveen Jindal School of Management and close to the main entrance of the university, groundbreaking for the two story 68, 459 sq ft Edith and Peter O’Donnell Jr. Athenaeum began on May 11, 2022 and is expected to be completed by 2024. The project is expected to cost $58 million, with around 55% of the cost being funded through university gifts.  Upon completion, the Athenaeum will be the largest major art museum north of I-635.

Collections 
The Edith and Peter O'Donnell Jr. Athenaeum will be home to the following collections:

 Trammell and Margret Crow Collection of Asian Art
 Barrett Collection of Swiss Art
 Brettell Reading Room housing the personal library of Dr. Richard Brettell
 Roger Horchow Collection
 The Laura and Dan Boeckman Collection of Latin American Folk Art
 The Bryan J. Stevens Collection of Masks of the Sierra de Puebla

Student life

Activities 

The University of Texas at Dallas has 300+ registered campus organizations and 26 national Greek-letter fraternities and sororities. UTD's  Activity Center contains a fitness center, racquetball courts, squash courts, basketball courts, a multi-purpose room, and indoor swimming pool. Also available are sand volleyball courts, soccer fields, tennis courts, softball fields, baseball fields and a disc golf course. Campus culture is generally more academically inclined compared to other major Texas universities, as traditional athletic sports are not a major focus of the institution.

Recreation and education teams

Chess 

The internationally ranked UT Dallas chess team was launched in 1996 under the direction of two-time president of the U.S. Chess Federation, Timothy Redman. The university recruits worldwide for its chess team and 24 Grandmasters and International Masters have played for UT Dallas from 1996 to 2018. The UTD chess team has won or tied for first place in the Pan-American Intercollegiate Chess Championship more than 10 times since 2000. As a result of the program's success, human-sized chess boards were installed in the campus' Mall. The university offers chess scholarships to qualified student players and several full four-year tuition tournament-based scholarships.

Achievements include the following:

 UT Dallas has taken first place in eight of its 12 appearances at the Texas State College Championship and the UTD chess team has won or tied for first place in the Southwest Collegiate Championship for 2003, 2004, 2006, 2007, 2008, 2009, 2010, 2011, 2014, 2016.
 The UTD chess team has won the Transatlantic Cup in 2007, 2008, 2009, 2010, 2016, 2017, and 2018. They tied for first place in the 2011, 2012, 2014, and 2015 matches with the University of Belgrade. Since 2000, UTD's chess players have won or tied ten Pan American Intercollegiate Team Chess Championship titles.
 The UT Dallas chess team has competed in each consecutive Final Four of Chess tournaments starting in 2001 though 2018, winning or tying for first place five times. Since 2019, UT Dallas has made 16 total appearances in the 19 years the Final Four tournament has existed.
 The U.S. Chess Federation selected UT Dallas as the Chess College of the Year for 2012.

Debate 

Established in the fall of 1996, UT Dallas Debate has consistently ranked in the top 25 debate programs nationally. Students engaged in college debate devote hundreds of hours per season researching and defending a specific policy resolution, in the process gaining a graduate-level understanding of complex social and political issues. UTD's Debate program is generally run under the Honors College and offers competitive scholarships to students. Since 2019, UTD has made 16 consecutive appearances at the National Debate Tournament, which is attended by the 78 best teams in the country.

Achievements include the following:
 Won the Cross Examination Debate Association's "Brady Lee Garrison Newcomer Sweepstakes Award" in spring 1997.
 UTD first qualified a team for the National Debate Tournament in 2004 and has qualified each year since. In 2004 the team also hosted its first annual "Fear and Loathing" tournament, with more than 325 participants, coaches, and judges in attendance.
 The UTD debate team placed in the top five at the American Debate Association national championships each year between 2009 and 2012.
UTD placed in the Top 10 of the National Debate Tournament in 2016.
In 2012 and 2018, the UTD debate team made it to the Sweet 16 of the Cross Examination Debate Association (CEDA) national tournament.
The UTD debate team qualified and placed in the finals of the Cross Examination Debate Association (CEDA) national tournament in 2019. In the same year, the UTD speech team qualified for and placed at the American Forensic Association national tournament and the National Forensic Association national tournament.

Pre-Law 
The school fields teams in the pre-law competitions: Moot Court, Mock Trial and Mediation. UTD is one of the few schools in Texas to field teams in all three major undergraduate legal advocacy competitions.

Achievements include the following:
 In November 2009, the UT Dallas team won the National Mediation Tournament championship in the advocate/client division. The tournament was held at the John Marshall Law School in Chicago.
 In 2010, UTD students again placed first and second in the advocate/client division to win the Dan Stamatelos National Trophy for Advocacy. The tournament was held at the Drake University Law School and UT Dallas was the only school to place two teams to the final rounds.
 UTD received first, second and fourth place at the November 2010, South Central Regional Moot Court Championships. The University of Arkansas at Little Rock's, William H. Bowen School of Law was host to the 32 teams.
 UT Dallas Moot Court debate team placed first overall in the regional competition at the American Collegiate Moot Court Association National Tournament, hosted January 2012 at Chapman University in Orange, California.
In 2013, one UT Dallas team reached the quarterfinals at the Southwest Regional Tournament, and another made it to the semifinals to earn a bid in the national tournament, hosted by the American Moot Court Association.
In 2016, UTD won the International Intercollegiate Mediation Tournament and qualified for the American Collegiate Moot Court Association tournament in California.
UTD qualified for the American Mock Trial Association’s Opening Round Championship Series in 2018.

Greek life 
The University of Texas at Dallas opened the Office of Fraternity and Sorority Life in 1992 with Kappa Sigma and Alpha Gamma Delta as the first fraternity and sorority on campus, respectively. Since then, it has grown to a community of over 1,000 students among its 26 Greek organizations as of Fall 2019. Each Greek organization is a member of one of the four councils on campus: the Interfraternity Council (IFC), the Collegiate Pan-Hellenic Council (CPC), the National Pan-Hellenic Council (NPHC), or the Multicultural Greek Council (MGC). The IFC and CPC are the largest councils by number of students, while the MGC, third in population, is the largest by number of entities.

The Interfraternity Council (IFC) is composed of eight men's fraternities: Alpha Lambda Mu (the first national Muslim fraternity, founded at UT Dallas), Chi Phi, Delta Tau Delta, Kappa Sigma, Phi Delta Theta, Phi Gamma Delta, Pi Kappa Phi, Sigma Alpha Epsilon.

The Collegiate Pan-Hellenic Council (CPC) is composed of four women's sororities: Alpha Gamma Delta, Delta Delta Delta, Delta Zeta, Kappa Alpha Theta.

The National Pan-Hellenic Council (NPHC), chartered on November 11, 2001, is composed of historically African-American fraternities and sororities that make up the "Divine Nine". Four of those nine entities are represented at UT Dallas: Alpha Kappa Alpha, Alpha Phi Alpha, Delta Sigma Theta, Sigma Gamma Rho.

Established in the Fall of 2002, The Multicultural Greek Council (MGC), composed of both fraternities and sororities, is the largest of the four councils by number of entities. Its member organizations are among the youngest national Greek organizations in the world and promote diversity among their membership, although some of them promote a specific cultural ethnicity or nationality. The nine entities are: Beta Chi Theta, Delta Epsilon Psi, Delta Kappa Delta, Kappa Delta Chi, Lambda Theta Phi, Omega Delta Phi, Sigma Lambda Alpha, Sigma Lambda Gamma, and Sigma Sigma Rho.

In addition, UT Dallas hosts four Greek-letter professional fraternities:

 Beta Alpha Psi, an accounting honors fraternity
 Delta Sigma Pi, a professional business fraternity
 Gamma Iota Sigma, a professional fraternity for insurance and risk management
 Tau Beta Pi, an engineering honors association

Student media 
The Mercury has been the official student newspaper of the University of Texas at Dallas since 1980. It publishes 5,000 copies every other Monday during the fall and spring semesters, and every third Monday during the summer. It is distributed free around campus and at the UTD newsroom in the Student Union. The Mercury also publishes online at utdmercury.com. In April 2011, The Mercury won 12 awards at the 101st annual Texas Intercollegiate Press Association IPA convention.

In 2004, another student print named A Modest Proposal (AMP) was formed. In contrast to The Mercury, which is almost all news articles, AMP is a magazine and features mostly editorial content. AMP is published once a month, eight times a year. Any student, faculty, or staff of UTD can contribute to the paper. Copies of AMP are available for free at the first of each month around the campus, and can also be downloaded in PDF format from their website. Radio UTD, the university's student-run, Internet-only, radio station offers streaming music 24 hours a day, 7 days a week and broadcasts UTD sports games. Radio UTD has also been featured on XM Satellite Radio Channel 43 (XMU) on The Student Exchange Program. The radio station was nominated for three college radio awards at the 2010 College Music Journal annual Music Marathon and Festival. The nominations were for the following categories: Best Use of the Internet, Best Use of Limited Resources and Station of the Year.

In 2009, UTD TV, an internet-based campus TV station, was founded and launched by students. It webcasts a range of student-interest programs from campus news and amusing serial stories to student affairs coverage.

Residential housing 

On-campus housing for the 2015–2016 academic year consisted of the University Commons five residential halls and 1,237 apartments. The apartment buildings 1–37, which make up 696 units and buildings 38–67, which make up 541 units, are owned by the university and privately managed by American Campus Communities under the name University Village. Buildings 1–37, previously known as the Waterview Park Apartments, were owned by the Utley Foundation and purchased by UTD on July 1, 2013. Apartment floor plans vary from 1-bedroom to 4-bedroom units and amenities include swimming pools, volleyball courts, outdoor grills, and study centers. According to a UTD Mercury article on September 18, 2011, both graduate and upperclassman housing continues to be in short supply due to the increase in enrollment.

On August 12, 2009, a  residence hall (Residence Hall South) opened, providing housing for 384 full-time freshmen residents and 16 peer advisers. The building includes a mix of three-bedroom, single-bath suites for freshmen and one-bedroom, one-bath units for peer advisers. On each wing and each floor are several communal study areas and the ground floor features a  glass-enclosed rotunda with pool and ping-pong tables, large-screen televisions, couches and chairs. A second,  residence hall, (Residence Hall North), was officially completed June 27, 2011, and a third freshman residence hall (Residence Hall Northwest) adjacent to the two existing halls was completed in August 2012. A fourth residence hall (Residence Hall Southwest) opened in time for the fall 2013 semester. Construction for a fifth residential facility (Residence Hall West) was started in July 2013 and completed in 2014. The 339,000-square-foot (31,500 m2) 600-bed facility includes a dining hall with seating for 800 and a recreation center. Residence Hall West houses the Living Learning Communities program that groups students with similar interests and majors together.

Construction has begun on two new apartment-style housing complexes known as Phase VI and Phase VII. The two complexes will offer a total of 800 beds and are expected to open in time for the fall 2017 semester.

In 2015, co-developers Balfour Beatty Campus Solutions and Wynne/Jackson began construction of a private mixed-use development known as Northside on leased university land directly adjacent to the main campus. Opened in time for the fall 2016 semester, the development offers 600 beds through a mix of one-, two-, and three-bedroom apartments and townhomes. Northside also includes 20,000 square feet of space for retail and food vendors, bringing an integrated residential and retail complex to the edge of campus for the first time.

Dining 
Students have a selection of food sources on campus, including commercial restaurants, primarily within the Student Union, and a traditional dining hall near the residence halls. Firehouse Subs, Chick-fil-A, Smoothie King, Halal Guys, Panda Express, Starbucks, and Einstein Bros. Bagels are some of the most popular restaurants. The Student Union dining hall opened on August 12, 2009 in conjunction with the opening of the first residence hall and was later replaced by a new dining hall within the Residence Hall West complex. The former Student Union dining hall was later replaced by an extended food court area featuring an expanded Chick-fil-A and a Panda Express, among other options. The Student Union building houses The Pub which features a sit-down restaurant atmosphere. Beginning in the fall 2016 semester, UT Dallas Dining began hosting local food trucks on campus. All first-year students living on campus are required to purchase a meal plan; meal plans are optional for all other students who live on campus.

Traditions 
UT Dallas has many distinct traditions that students, alumni, faculty, family, friends, and fans regularly partake in. The student body is collectively known as the Comets, while the college's mascot is Temoc. The official university colors are flame orange, brilliance white, and evergreen. "Flame" orange remains as a nod to the "burnt" orange UT Austin, and white now represents the color of a comet in the sky. Green has become representative several iconic landmarks – the (former) surrounding cotton field, the (current) on-campus magnolia trees, and the green neon color of the Dallas skyline at night produced from the Bank of America Plaza building. The Whoosh (salute) is a way for students to show campus unity. The salute and hand gesture was named the "Whoosh" by students because it is the sound a comet would make if there was sound in space.

Some of the traditions that give UT Dallas its distinctive flavor are Homecoming, Annual Oozeball Tournament, Ceremonial Mace, Legacy Lane, Welcome Week, Family Day, Splatterdance, Springapalooza and Cecil Green's Head. Cecil Green helped found the University of Texas at Dallas and outside Green Hall there is a bronze bust of Cecil Green. Rubbing Green's head for good luck has become a tradition for many students on their way to exams or presentations. Holiday Sing is one of the oldest traditions on campus, the annual Holiday Sing started in 1976 and is hosted by the School of Arts and Humanities during the month of December.

Resting in front of the Texas Instruments Plaza is the sculpture Jack, created in 1971 by artist Jim Love (1927–2005). Margaret McDermott, wife of UTD founder Eugene McDermott (1899–1973), presented the sculpture to the university in 1976. The sculpture is affectionately known on campus as the Love Jack. Recently added is the Spirit Rock in front of the Activity Center building. Students and organizations are allowed to paint whatever they like on the rock, provided it conforms to rules of student conduct.

Athletics 
UT Dallas has DIII varsity athletics, competitive club teams, and intramural sports teams. Athletic teams are known as the Comets, while the mascot is Temoc ("Temoc" is "comet" spelled backwards.)

Varsity 
The University of Texas at Dallas' Varsity athletics program started when UTD provisionally joined the NCAA Division III and the American Southwest Conference (ASC) in 1998 and was granted full membership in the ASC in 2002. Varsity sports include baseball, basketball, cross country, esports, golf, soccer, softball, tennis, and volleyball. In total, there are 300 student athletes and 14 intercollegiate teams officially supported by the university. Below is a list of varsity team achievements.

Baseball & Softball

 In 2003–04, the men's baseball and women's softball teams advanced to the post-season.
 The men's baseball team won the 2012 season ASC East Division Champions after closing out the regular season with a 27–13 overall record (14–4 in the ASC) and qualifying for the ASC Tournament for the ninth time in the program's 11-year history.
 In 2016–17, the women's softball team claimed their fifth ASC title after winning their first ASC championship game.
 The men's baseball team won their first ASC championship conference title in 2018.

Basketball

 In 2003–04, men's basketball advanced to the post-season.
 In 2005, the UTD Athletic Program claimed their first ASC Championship for men's basketball and advanced to the NCAA Division III national playoffs.
 On December 20, 2006 the Comets men's basketball team upset the University of Texas at Arlington Mavericks 78–76 at UT Arlington's Texas Hall and became the first Division III team to defeat a Division I basketball team during the 2006–2007 season.
 The woman's 2009 basketball team won the ASC East Division title, whereas the UTD men's basketball team won the ASC East Division both in 2010 and 2011.
 The UT Dallas women basketball team won the 2013 American Southwest Conference title.
 The UT Dallas men's basketball team won the 2014 ASC Tournament.
 Women's basketball won the ASC conference crown in 2016–17.
 For the first time in school history, both the Men's and Women's basketball teams won the 2018 NCAA Division III conference championships in the ASC Tournament.

Cross country

Women's cross country team won their first ASC conference crown in 2016 and their second in 2017. The men's cross country team won their first ASC conference crown in 2018.

Esports

On September 24, 2018, the university added a co-ed Varsity Esports team managed under the athletic department. The team officially competes in collegiate competitions for League of Legends, Overwatch, and Super Smash Bros. Ultimate.

 In their inaugural year, UTD Esports ranked No. 8 overall in collegiate League of Legends competitions according to an official ESPN poll.
 In 2019 UTD Esports won the first US collegiate Super Smash Bros. Ultimate competition at the Collegiate Starleague Smash Ultimate National Championships, taking home the program's first national title.

Golf

Women's golf won its first ASC conference championship title in 2008, and placed 3rd in 2015.

Soccer

 During the 2002 inaugural season, the men and women's soccer teams competed for conference championships. The women won the 2002 ASC title and UTD ended up hosting the conference tournament as well as the first round of NCAA playoffs in UTD's first year as active members.
 The success continued in 2003–04 when men's and women's soccer advanced to the post-season.
 In 2005, the UTD Athletic Program claimed ASC Championships for men's and women's soccer, with the men's soccer team advancing to the NCAA Division III national playoffs.
 In 2007, the men's soccer team won the ASC championship, advancing to the NCAA tournament. Having 8 new team players as starters and only 3 veterans, the Comets led by top goal scorers Kevin White from Houston and Mihai Cotet from Braila, Romania led the team to its second ASC Tournament title in history.
 Men's soccer won an ASC conference crown in 2016–17.

Tennis

 The 2007 men's tennis program had a very successful season, beating Division II teams and advancing as far as the ASC Conference final before falling to Hardin-Simmons.
 The UT Dallas varsity tennis program won both the 2013 American Southwest Conference men's and women's tennis championships.
 Women's tennis won the 2018 ASC championship title.
Both the Men's and Women's tennis teams won the 2019 ASC championship title.

Volleyball

 The women's volleyball team claimed the 2009 American Southwest Conference championship at the UT Dallas Activity Center. The 25–0, 2009 women's volleyball team was the only undefeated NCAA Division III team in the nation at the time.
 The women's volleyball team won the 2011 ASC East title with an undefeated home record of 6–0, and a conference record of 14–2.
 In 2016–17, the women's volleyball team won an ASC conference crown.

Competitive club sports 
In addition to varsity sports, the university's Club Sports program offers recreational and competitive opportunities across approximately 30 teams. UT Dallas' Recreation Center hosts many recognized student organizations that have been formed, organized, managed, and maintained by students leaders. While they are not part of the Varsity program, many do compete and officially represent the university.

UTD club sports include: Archery, Badminton, Climbing, Cycling, Fencing, Gymnastics, Japanese Karate, Jujutsu, Kung Fu, Lacrosse, Mixed Martial Arts, Weightlifting, Powerlifting, Rugby, Running, Soccer, Swimming, Table Tennis, Taekwondo, Tennis, Ultimate Frisbee, and Wrestling.

Club Sport Achievements

The UTD Rugby Club Sports team won the Texas Rugby Union Collegiate Division III state championship in February 2012.

The UTD Fencing Club Sports team was the Southwest Intercollegiate Fencing Association (SWIFA) championship team in 2018 and 2019 and was also in first place in 2020 before the CoVid pandemic ended its campaign.

Intramural sports 
UT Dallas has several intramural sports teams. These teams compete only within UTD, as all teams are organized groups of current students. While available sports and teams can vary each year, teams offered in Spring 2019 include: Badminton, Basketball, Battleship, Cricket, Esports, Flag Football, Sand Volleyball, Soccer, Table Tennis, Tennis, Ultimate Frisbee, Wiffleball, and Xtreme Dodgeball.

Notable people 

Notable UT Dallas faculty, staff, and alumni include an Antarctic explorer, an astronaut, members of the National Academies, four Nobel laureates, a writer and folklorist, a member of India's Parliament, and the founder of the world's first molecular nanotechnology company.

See also 
 List of The University of Texas at Dallas people

References

External links 
 

 
Universities and colleges accredited by the Southern Association of Colleges and Schools
American Association of State Colleges and Universities
Universities and colleges in the Dallas–Fort Worth metroplex
Dallas
Educational institutions established in 1969
University of Texas at Dallas
University of Texas at Dallas
University of Texas at Dallas
University of Texas at Dallas
1969 establishments in Texas
University of Texas Dallas